Robert Glenn may refer to:
 Robert Glenn (Wisconsin state senator)
 Robert Glenn Sr., member of the Wisconsin state assembly and father of the state senator
 Robert Broadnax Glenn, governor of North Carolina